Gelanor is a genus of spiders in the family Mimetidae, found in Central and South America.

Species
, the World Spider Catalog accepted the following species:

Gelanor altithorax Keyserling, 1893 – Brazil, Argentina
Gelanor consequus O. Pickard-Cambridge, 1902 – Mexico, Costa Rica to Bolivia
Gelanor fortuna Benavides & Hormiga, 2016 – Panama
Gelanor innominatus Chamberlin, 1916 – Peru
Gelanor juruti Benavides & Hormiga, 2016 – Venezuela, Guyana, Brazil
Gelanor latus (Keyserling, 1881) – Mexico, Guatemala, Nicaragua to Bolivia
Gelanor moyobamba Benavides & Hormiga, 2016 – Peru
Gelanor muliebris Dyal, 1935 – Pakistan
Gelanor siquirres Benavides & Hormiga, 2016 – Costa Rica
Gelanor waorani Benavides & Hormiga, 2016 – Colombia, Ecuador, Brazil
Gelanor zonatus (C. L. Koch, 1845) (type species) – Mexico to Uruguay

References

Mimetidae
Araneomorphae genera
Spiders of Central America
Spiders of South America